The Emmet House Site is a historical landmark designated by the San Diego, California government Historical Resources Board.  The original construction started in the 1860s. Emmet House Site was constructed as a rooming house and restaurant and was later the location of San Diego's first County Hospital. The hospital operated during the 1870s. A coffin was stolen from the building in 1883. The building was demolished in 1949 but a historical marker has been placed at its original location. .

It is one of over a dozen landmarks designated by the Historical Resources Board on November 4, 1970.

References

1860s architecture in the United States
1860s establishments in California
1949 disestablishments in California
Buildings and structures demolished in 1949
County hospitals in California
Demolished buildings and structures in California
Hospitals in San Diego
Historic sites in California
Restaurants in San Diego County, California
Tourist accommodations in the United States